Speranza grossbecki is a species of moth in the family Geometridae first described by William Barnes and James Halliday McDunnough in 1913. It is found in North America.

The MONA or Hodges number for Speranza grossbecki is 6315.

References

Further reading

 

Macariini
Articles created by Qbugbot
Moths described in 1913